Bedardi   is a 1993 Indian Hindi-language action, romance film produced by Lawrence D'Souza and Manohar Pandya. The film is directed by Krishankant Pandya. The film stars Ajay Devgan, Urmila Matondkar, Naseeruddin Shah, Reena Roy. The film's music is by Laxmikant-Pyarelal. The film was released on 12 November 1993.

Box Office 
Movie had lifetime worldwide gross box office collection was 5.39 Cr.

Cast
 Ajay Devgan as Vijay 'Viju' Saxena
 Urmila Matondkar as Honey
 Naseeruddin Shah as Professor Nirbhay Saxena
 Reena Roy as Preeti N. Saxena
 Upasna Singh in Dance number 'Maney sote diya jagay'
 Baby Gazala as Ritu N. Saxena
 Sonia Mulay as Suman Saxena
 Kiran Kumar as Kanhaiya aka K.K. aka Kanya
 Ashok Banthia as Police Inspector
 Makrand Deshpande as Gulla
 Deven Verma as Bhagwandas

Music

References

External links
 

1993 films
1990s romantic action films
Indian romantic action films
1990s Hindi-language films